Hedwig of Formbach ( 1058 – c. 1090) was the daughter of Frederick, count of Formbach and of Gertrude of Haldensleben, and heiress to Süpplingenburg Castle. She was the mother of Emperor Lothair II.

Marriages 
Hedwig's first husband was Gebhard of Supplinburg. According to the Sächsische Weltchronik, Gebhard had to overcome the resistance of his rivals, the counts of Goseck, relatives of Archbishop Adalbert of Bremen, who tried to have the marriage annulled. After Gebhard's death in June 1075 at the Battle of Langensalza, Hedwig married Theodoric II, Duke of Lorraine (as his first wife).

Children 
With Gebhard, Hedwig had two children: 
 Lothair, later Holy Roman Emperor
 Ida (d.1138), who married Sighard IX (d. 1104), count of Tengling, Schala and Burghausen

With Theoderic, Hedwig had: 
 Simon (1076 – 1138), who succeeded Theoderic as Duke of Lorraine, and was married to Adelaide of Leuven (d. 1158), daughter of his stepmother Gertrude and Henry III, Count of Leuven. 
 Gertrude (who later changed her name to Petronilla) (died 1144), who married Floris II of Holland

References

Sources

 

1050s births
1090 deaths
Year of birth uncertain
Year of death uncertain
11th-century German women
11th-century German nobility
House of Süpplinburger
House of Metz
Duchesses of Lorraine